Fareast International University (FIU) is a private university located at Banani in Dhaka, Bangladesh. The university was established in 2013 under the Private University Act, 2010. It was founded by Sheikh Kabir Hossain, relative of Prime Minister Sheikh Hasina.

FIU is currently operating trimester basis in 16 graduate and masters programs under the faculty of Business Administration, Engineering, Science, Liberal Arts & Social Sciences and LAW. FIU introduces international standard course curricula approved by the UGC of Bangladesh. Besides, there are different clubs and houses for debate, English language, indoor-games, cultural practices, and sports facilities for the benefit of the learners. It has research and academic collaborations with number of foreign universities.

FIU is the first private university in Bangladesh selected by the Government to offer MBA Major in Project Monitoring and Evaluation. Moreover, FIU has established "Integrated Research Institute for Inclusive Development (IRIID)" for action research on various issues of the contemporary world and appropriate technology transfer for sustainable development.

Faculties/Department 
 Faculty of Business Administration
 Department of Business Administration
 Department of Tourism & Hospitality Management
 Faculty of Engineering
 Department of Electrical & Electronic Engineering (EEE)
 Department of Computer Science & Engineering (CSE)
 Department of Civil & Environmental Engineering (CEE)
 Department of Textile Engineering
 Department of Architecture
 Faculty of Science
 Department of Physics
 Department of Chemistry
 Department of Mathematics
 Department of Soil, Water & Environment (SWE)
 Department of Public Health
 Faculty of Liberal Arts & Social Sciences
 Department of English
 Department of Islamic Studies
 Faculty of Law
 Department of Law & Justice

Infrastructure 
Administrative functionaries are accountable to the trustee board and the management in discharging their responsibilities.

It has a library with textbooks and reference items, and laboratories for basic sciences, computing and engineering practical experiments. FIU has purchased 1.14 acres of land in the RAJUK Uttara 3rd Phase Land Development Project in Sector 16 for its permanent campus.

References

External links 
 FIU Official Website

Educational institutions established in 2013
Universities and colleges in Dhaka
Private universities in Bangladesh
Private engineering universities of Bangladesh
Universities of science and technology in Bangladesh
Engineering universities of Bangladesh
Technological institutes of Bangladesh
Architecture schools in Bangladesh
2013 establishments in Bangladesh